Longhirst railway station served the village of Longhirst, Morpeth, England from 1847 to 1964 on the East Coast Main Line.

History 
The station was opened on 1 July 1847, by the York, Newcastle and Berwick Railway. The station was situated south of the level crossing on an unnamed lane one mile away from Longhirst village. Two sidings were located to the south of the station, one of them serving a lime depot. In the 1937-1938 LNER winter timetable, it was shown that the frequency of train departures had decreased since the NER days. Passenger traffic continued to decline and the station closed for passengers on 29 October 1951. The platforms were demolished in 1957 but goods traffic continued to be handled until 10 August 1964 when the station closed completely.

References

External links 

Disused railway stations in Northumberland
Former North Eastern Railway (UK) stations
Railway stations in Great Britain opened in 1847
Railway stations in Great Britain closed in 1951
1847 establishments in England
1964 disestablishments in England